Kolos Stadium is a football venue located in Kovalivka, Kyiv Oblast, Ukraine. Currently the Ukrainian Premier League football club FC Kolos Kovalivka plays their home games at the stadium.

History
In 2014 the stadium was rebuilt anew in place of half ruined stadium located at same location. Previously in 2011-2014 the senior team played in Terezyne, Bila Tserkva Raion and Mala Soltanivka, Vasylkiv Raion.

The official opening of the renovated stadium was announced for 2 September 2020. The new construction of the stadium allows for the stadium to be used for European competitions. The new stadium allows for up to 5,000 seats for spectators. The pitch is heated with an automated sprinkler system. The first fixture after renovation was on 5 September 2020 with a friendly match against Dynamo Kyiv. The first official match on the new stadium was Ukrainian Premier League round 2 game against FC Lviv, which was won by Kolos 4–0 with Volodymyr Lysenko scoring the first ever official goal at the new stadium.

References

External links 
 Mazur, K. The team without which we won't live (Команда, без которой им не жить). Sport Arena. 23 May 2016.

Football venues in Ukraine
Sports venues in Kyiv Oblast
Sport in Kyiv Oblast
FC Kolos Kovalivka